Manic-1 is a hydroelectric power station and dam at the mouth of the Manicouagan River  west of Baie-Comeau, Quebec, Canada. The power station was commissioned between 1966 and 1967 and producing 184 MW, it is the smallest of the Manicouagan-Outardes project.

History
Between 1949 and 1956, to keep up with increasing electricity demands, the Manicouagan Power Company constructed and upgraded a 126 MW hydroelectric power station on the falls of the Manicouagan River' mouth. Electricity demand continued to rise with the construction of local grain elevators and an aluminum smelter. This power station was further supported and regulated by the McCormick Dam on St. Anne lake which Hydro-Québec had completed by 1959. However, as plans for the Manicouagan-Outardes project progressed, engineers discovered that water flow at the mouth of the Manicouagan could be better utilized. At Hydro-Québec's request, the Manicouagan Power Company further upgraded the McCormick plant's capacity to 190 MW. Additionally, Hydro-Québec decided to build the Manic-1 generating station adjacent to and augmenting the existing plant and dam.

Characteristics
The Manic-1 Dam consists of a concrete center portion that houses the power station and two rock-fill dikes on either side.

At the time of the plant's commission, Manic-1 was expected to operate as a peaker plant, generally run only at times of high demand for electricity, known as peak demand. It was expected to generate 40 gigawatt-hours annually.

See also

 McCormick Dam
 Jean-Lesage generating station
 René-Lévesque generating station
 Daniel-Johnson Dam
 History of Hydro-Québec
 List of hydroelectric stations in Quebec

Notes

References
 .

Baie-Comeau
Manicouagan-Outardes hydroelectric project
Dams in Quebec
Dams completed in 1966
Publicly owned dams in Canada